Bolivia–Colombia relations refers to the current and historical relationship between Bolivia and Colombia. Both countries are members of the Organization of American States and the Andean Community.

Resident diplomatic missions

 Bolivia has an embassy in Bogotá.
 Colombia has an embassy in La Paz.

See also  
 Foreign relations of Bolivia
 Foreign relations of Colombia

References 

 
Colombia
Bolivia